The Great Comet of 1819, officially designated as C/1819 N1, also known as Comet Tralles, was an exceptionally bright and easily visible comet, approaching an apparent magnitude of 1–2, discovered July 1, 1819 by the German astronomer Johann Georg Tralles in Berlin. It was the first comet analyzed using polarimetry, by French mathematician François Arago.

Discovery
On July 1, 1819, Johann Georg Tralles in Berlin observed a brilliant comet low in the sky during the evening twilight. It was confirmed the next night by the astronomer Johann Elert Bode, also in Berlin.

Observations
On July 2, Tralles found the comet to have a coma of 40″. On July 3, Friedrich Georg Wilhelm von Struve measured the nucleus at 8″ with a tail of several degrees.  Heinrich Wilhelm Matthias Olbers reported that the nucleus had an apparent magnitude of 1–2 and a tail about 7–8° long. The comet was last sighted by Struve on October 25.

Also on July 3, François Arago used a polarimeter of his own invention to analyze the light from the  comet's tail and discovered that it was polarized. He then observed the nearest star, Capella, which did not show polarized light. This indicated that some light from the comet's tail was reflected from the sun. This marked the first polarimetric observation of a comet.

Transit of the Sun

After the orbital elements of the comet were calculated by Olbers, he discovered that a transit of the Sun by the comet had occurred on June 26, days before its first observations. He reported this to Bode on July 27. After this announcement many Sun observers searched their notes to see if they had noted something unusual that day. Johann Wilhelm Pastorff noted that he saw that day a round nebulousity with a bright spot near its center and made a sketch of it. Canon Stark from Augsburg also noted in Meteorologisches Jahrbuch that he saw an ill defined small spot in the Sun at 7:15 A.M. on June 26 15' 25" from the west limp of the Sun that wasn't present at noon. John Russell Hind noted that the positions given by Johann Wilhelm Pastorff are cosiderably off by the expected location of the comet, while he also considers improbable that the comet would look like that. On the other hand, he concludes that Canon Stark perhaps did observe the comet, although the mentioned position is a bit off. R.L. Branham agrees that Canon Stark likely indeed saw the transit.

Orbit
Orbital elements for the comet were calculated by several astronomers. The orbit is classified as parabolic and is nearly perpendicular to Earth's orbital plane, with an inclination of 80°.

The orbit of the comet and its transit of the Sun were later analyzed by astronomer John Russell Hind.

In 2016 the orbit was recalculated based on a total of 692 observations of the comet taken in 1819, with the resulting conclusion that the comet will not return for over 3,000 years and represents no threat to the Earth, and that Near Eastern records around 2550 BCE may be found to mention its earlier passage.

In literature
The comet was widely seen and noted by people who were not astronomers. Poet John Keats noted how he and his wife Fanny had stared at the comet. Historian Nathaniel Philbrick writes about the great comet seen in July 1819 by the people on the island of Nantucket, Massachusetts in his 2000 book, In the Heart of the Sea. The comet was observed by the Stephen Long expedition to the Great Plains from near present day Jefferson City, Missouri.

References

External links
 JPL DASTCOM Orbital Elements
 

1819
Astronomical objects discovered in 1819
Great comets